The Horologicon: A Day's Jaunt Through the Lost Words of the English Language, published in 2012, is a non-fiction book by Mark Forsyth.

References

2012 non-fiction books
Etymology
English-language books
Icon Books books
Berkley Books books